Zeita is a  village in the Sidon District of the South Governorate in Lebanon.

History

In 1875 Victor Guérin traveled in the region, and he  "reached Zeita, a village that crowns a high hill and whose name seems ancient. Its population is 200, all Métualis."

References

Bibliography

External links
Zeita, Localiban 

Populated places in Sidon District
Shia Muslim communities in Lebanon